The American Lacrosse League was a professional lacrosse league that played in 1988.  It was founded by Terry Wallace and Bruce Meierdiercks, former teammates at Adelphi University.  The league folded after five weeks of play.

Teams
 Baltimore Tribe
 Boston Militia
 Denver Rifles
 Long Island Sachems
 New Jersey Arrows
 Syracuse Spirit

Final 1988 ALL standings

Schedule and results
 April 24
 Syracuse 13 @ Long Island 17
 Baltimore W @ New Jersey L
 Denver W @ Boston L
May 1
Syracuse 17 @ New Jersey 15
Boston 14 @ Baltimore 11
Denver 13 @ Long Island 14
May 8
Syracuse 19 @ Baltimore 13
New Jersey 12 @ Denver 13 OT
Long Island 15 @ Boston 18
May 15
Boston 15 @ Syracuse 20
Denver 12 @ Baltimore 22
New Jersey 14 @ Long Island 17
May 18
Denver Rifles fold
May 21
New Jersey 13 @ Syracuse 26
Game moved to Saturday due to Syracuse University home game on May 22
May 22
Denver @ Syracuse
Game not played because Denver folded
Long Island @ Baltimore
Game moved to May 21 due to Johns Hopkins home game, then cancelled due to competition from Preakness
Boston @ New Jersey
New Jersey played Syracuse on May 21 due to graduation at Montlair State, New Jersey's home field

See also

References

1988 establishments in the United States
1988 disestablishments in the United States
Lacrosse leagues in the United States
1988 in lacrosse
Sports leagues established in 1988
Sports leagues disestablished in 1988